The Alabama–Penn State football rivalry is an American college football rivalry between the Alabama Crimson Tide football team of the University of Alabama and Penn State Nittany Lions football team of Pennsylvania State University. Dormant since 1990, the series was renewed in 2010 in Tuscaloosa and then 2011 in State College.

Notable games

1959 Liberty Bowl

1975 Sugar Bowl

1979 Sugar Bowl

Alabama scored in the second quarter, then Penn State answered in the third, then Alabama took a 14–7 lead on a touchdown set up by a 62-yard punt return. Penn State had a chance to tie in the fourth, but Chuck Fusina threw an interception into the Alabama end zone. Then the Crimson Tide had a chance to put the game away, but fumbled the football back to Penn State at the Nittany Lion 19-yard-line with four minutes to go. Penn State drove to a first and goal at the Alabama eight. On third and goal from the one, Fusina asked Bama linebacker Marty Lyons "What do you think we should do?", and Lyons answered "You'd better pass." On third down, Penn State was stopped inches short of the goal line. On fourth down, Penn State was stopped again, Barry Krauss meeting Mike Guman and throwing him back for no gain. Alabama held on for a 14–7 victory.

Game results

See also 
 List of NCAA college football rivalry games

References 

College football rivalries in the United States
Alabama Crimson Tide football
Penn State Nittany Lions football